Joseph Boutin Bourassa (13 November 1853 – 12 July 1943) was a politician and notary. He was elected to the House of Commons of Canada in 1911 as a Member of the Liberal Party to represent the riding of Lévis. He was re-elected in 1917 as a Laurier Liberal and 1921. He lost the 1908 election in Lévis to Louis-Auguste Carrier.

External links
 

1853 births
1943 deaths
Laurier Liberals
Liberal Party of Canada MPs
Members of the House of Commons of Canada from Quebec
Quebec notaries
Place of death missing